José Sette Câmara Filho (14 April 1920, Alfenas – 30 August 2002, Rio de Janeiro) was a Brazilian lawyer, diplomat, and politician. He served as Judge of the International Court of Justice 1979 to 1988. From 1982 to 1985, he was Vice President of the Court.

Câmara Filho graduated from the Faculty of Law of the Federal University of Minas Gerais in 1945 and pursued graduate studies at the University of McGill. He was Permanent Representative of Brazil to the United Nations in both Geneva and New York. He also served as member of the International Law Commission.

References 

International law scholars
Brazilian jurists
1920 births
2002 deaths